Deli Fuad Pasha (Modern Turkish: Deli Fuat Paşa; 1835 – 17 April 1931) was an Ottoman marshal and 
ambassador, who participated in the Russo-Turkish War (1877–1878).

Deli Fuad was a founding member of the Freedom and Accord Party.

References

1835 births
1931 deaths
Ottoman Army generals
Diplomats of the Ottoman Empire
Members of the Senate of the Ottoman Empire